, often known as Alex, is a former professional footballer who played as a midfielder. Born in Brazil, he became a Japanese citizen and made 82 appearances for the Japan national team.

Club career
Santos was born in Maringá in Paraná and moved to Japan in 1994 at the age of sixteen. He enrolled in Meitoku Gijuku High School in Kōchi and played football for the school club. After graduating from the school, he joined the J1 League team Shimizu S-Pulse in 1997. In 1999, the club won the second place and he received the J.League Player of the Year. In Asia, the club won the champions 1999–2000 Asian Cup Winners' Cup and third place 2000–01 Asian Cup Winners' Cup.

In August 2002, Santos agreed to join English Premier League club Charlton Athletic. But he was denied a work permit by the Home Office because he had not made the minimum number of national team appearances required for players from outside the European Union and returned to Shimizu for the remainder of the season. In January 2004, he left Shimizu to join the Urawa Reds. After won the second place at J1 League for two years in a row (2004, 2005), the club won the champions in 2006 J1 League.

In January 2007, Santos was loaned out to Red Bull Salzburg. He went back to Urawa in January 2008. He received a serious injury in a test match and had only one appearance in this season. In July 2009, he agreed to move to Nagoya Grampus. He made 55 appearances for the club, before joining J2 League side Tochigi SC for the 2013 season. He made 25 appearances there, scoring twice. In January 2014, he joined fellow J2 League team FC Gifu.

International career
In 2001, Santos obtained Japanese citizenship. He made his first appearance for Japan national team on 21 March 2002, against Ukraine, and he was part of Philippe Troussier's selection for the 2002 World Cup. He was the second foreign-born person to play for Japan in the World Cup finals after Wagner Lopes, who played in the 1998 World Cup and also the fifth naturalized citizen to play for Japan after Daishiro Yoshimura, George Yonashiro, Ruy Ramos, and Lopes.

After Zico took over as the national team manager, Santos was used on the left side of the Japanese lineup, as a full-back in a 4-4-2 formation or a midfielder in a 3-5-2 formation. At the 2004 Asian Cup, he played in all 6 matches and Japan won. He was selected in Japan's 2006 World Cup squad in May 2006, providing an assist for Keiji Tamada in a group stage match against his former country Brazil. He played 82 games and scored 7 goals for Japan until 2006.

Career statistics

Club

International

Scores and results list Japan's goal tally first, score column indicates score after each Santos goal.

Honours
Shimizu S-Pulse
Asian Cup Winners' Cup: 1999–2000
Emperor's Cup: 2001
Japanese Super Cup: 2002

Urawa Red Diamonds
J1 League: 2006
Emperor's Cup: 2005, 2006
Japanese Super Cup: 2002, 2006

Red Bull Salzburg
Austrian Bundesliga: 2006–07

Nagoya Grampus
J1 League: 2010

Japan
AFC Asian Cup: 2004

Individual
J.League MVP: 1999
J1 League Best Eleven: 1999

References

External links

Japan National Football Team Database

No divided loyalties for Alex , FIFAworldcup.com, 22 June 2005

1977 births
Living people
Brazilian emigrants to Japan
Naturalized citizens of Japan
People from Maringá
Brazilian footballers
Japanese footballers
Association football midfielders
Japan international footballers
J1 League players
J2 League players
Shimizu S-Pulse players
Urawa Red Diamonds players
Nagoya Grampus players
Tochigi SC players
FC Gifu players
Austrian Football Bundesliga players
FC Red Bull Salzburg players
J1 League Player of the Year winners
2002 FIFA World Cup players
2003 FIFA Confederations Cup players
2004 AFC Asian Cup players
2005 FIFA Confederations Cup players
2006 FIFA World Cup players
AFC Asian Cup-winning players
Japanese expatriate footballers
Brazilian expatriate sportspeople in Austria
Japanese expatriate sportspeople in Austria
Expatriate footballers in Austria
Brazilian expatriate sportspeople in Japan
Expatriate footballers in Japan
Expatriate footballers in Brazil
Sportspeople from Paraná (state)